The 1901 Spring Hill Badgers football team was an American football team that represented Spring Hill College as an independent during the 1901 college football season. In their first year, the team compiled an 0–1 record.

Schedule

References

Spring Hill
Spring Hill Badgers football seasons
College football winless seasons
Spring Hill Badgers football